The  is a suburban electric multiple unit (EMU) train type introduced in March 1987 by Japanese National Railways (JNR) shortly before its breakup and privatization, and currently operated by West Japan Railway Company (JR-West) and Central Japan Railway Company (JR Central) in Japan. It is based on the earlier 211 series, although it differs in having two pairs of doors per side on each car instead of three.

Operations
From 1988 to 2003, the JR-West sets were mainly used for the Marine Liner service connecting  and  via the Great Seto Bridge. These trains sometimes used a panoramic cab car (numbered KuRo 212), the latter was scrapped in 2008.

Formations

JR-West

3-car sets

2-car sets

U@tech

JR Central

2-car sets

La Malle de Bois tourist train

From spring 2016, a 213 series two-car set was modified to operate on sightseeing services in the Okayama area. The train is modified with bicycle spaces and seat approximately 52 passengers.

The train is formed as follows.

References

External links

 JR Central 213 series information 

Electric multiple units of Japan
West Japan Railway Company
Central Japan Railway Company
Hitachi multiple units
Kawasaki multiple units
Train-related introductions in 1987
Tokyu Car multiple units
Kinki Sharyo multiple units
Nippon Sharyo multiple units
1500 V DC multiple units of Japan